Chilonopsis is an extinct genus of air-breathing land snails, terrestrial pulmonate gastropod molluscs in the family Achatinidae. All species were found on Saint Helena

Species
Species within the genus Chilonopsis include:
 Chilonopsis blofeldi
 Chilonopsis exulatus
 Chilonopsis helena
 Chilonopsis melanoides
 Chilonopsis nonpareil
 Chilonopsis subplicatus
 Chilonopsis subtruncatus
 Chilonopsis turtoni

References

 
Taxonomy articles created by Polbot